Seven ships of the Royal Navy have borne the name HMS Danae, after the Greek heroine Danaë.

She was broken up by 1771.
  was a 32-gun fifth rate captured from the French in 1779. She was sold in 1797.
  was a 20-gun sixth-rate post ship, formerly the French frigate, Vaillante. In March 1800 members of her crew mutinied, took control and handed her over to the French.
  was an  wooden screw corvette launched in 1867.  She was lent to the War Department in 1886 as a hulk and was sold in 1906.
  was a  light cruiser launched in 1918.  She was lent to  the Polish Navy between 1944 and 1946 as ORP Conrad and was sold for scrapping in 1948.
 HMS Danae was to have been a  named HMS Vimiera. She was later reordered as a  destroyer, but was cancelled in 1946.
  was a  launched in 1965.  She was sold to Ecuador in 1991 and renamed Moran Valverde.

Royal Navy ship names